The Delhi Way is a 1964 documentary about Delhi produced, written, photographed and directed by James Ivory.   It is narrated by Leo Genn.

External links
  The Delhi Way details on 'Merchant Ivory Productions'
 

Culture of Delhi
1964 films
American documentary films
Films directed by James Ivory
Documentary films about cities
Documentary films about India
1964 documentary films
Films scored by Vilayat Khan
Films with screenplays by James Ivory
1960s English-language films
1960s American films